Capture of Berwick or Siege of Berwick may refer to:

 Capture of Berwick (1296)
 Siege of Berwick (1318)
 Siege of Berwick (1333)
 Sieges of Berwick (1355 and 1356)
 Capture of Berwick (1482)